Ecuador participated at the 2018 Summer Youth Olympics in Buenos Aires, Argentina from 6 October to 18 October 2018.

Medalists
Medals awarded to participants of mixed-NOC teams are represented in italics. These medals are not counted towards the individual NOC medal tally.

|width="30%" align=left valign=top|

Athletics

Boys
Track and road events

Field events

Girls
Track and road events

Field events

Beach volleyball

Ecuador qualified a boys' team based on their overall ranking from the South American Youth Tour.

Cycling

Ecuador qualified a mixed BMX racing team based on its ranking in the Youth Olympic Games BMX Junior Nation Rankings.

 Mixed BMX racing team - 1 team of 2 athletes

BMX racing

Gymnastics

Artistic
Ecuador qualified one gymnast based on its performance at the 2018 European Junior Championship.

 Boys' artistic individual all-around - 1 quota

Boys

Multidiscipline

Judo

Individual

Team

Roller speed skating

Sport climbing

Ecuador qualified one sport climber based on its performance at the 2017 Pan American Youth Sport Climbing Championships.

 Boys' combined - 1 quota (Galo Hernandez)

Swimming

Taekwondo

Triathlon

Ecuador qualified two athletes based on its performance at the 2018 American Youth Olympic Games Qualifier.

Individual

Relay

Weightlifting

Ecuador qualified one athlete based on its performance at the 2017 World Youth Championships.

Boy

Girl

Wrestling

Key:
  – Victory by Fall
  – Without any points scored by the opponent
  – With point(s) scored by the opponent
  – Without any points scored by the opponent
  – With point(s) scored by the opponent

References

2018 in Ecuadorian sport
Nations at the 2018 Summer Youth Olympics
Ecuador at the Youth Olympics